Pierre Charlot,(b.1205/1209 - d. 1249), was the illegitimate son of Philip II of France and an unknown mother. He held the offices of treasurer of St. Martin of Tours, St. Frambaud of Senlis, and St. Fursy of Peronne. Elected bishop of Noyon in 1240, Pierre accompanied Louis IX of France on the Seventh Crusade. He died near Cyprus in 1249 and was buried in the cathedral of Noyon.

Life
Pierre was born between 1205 and 1209. Despite his illegitimate birth, his father hired William the Breton to tutor him. Following the death of his father, his tutor dedicated the prologue in his "Philippidos" to him. His father obtained a dispensation from Pope Honorius III which allowed Pierre to hold ecclesiastical benefices.

Appointments
By 1232, Pierre was appointed treasurer of the church of St Martin in Tours. In 1234 a number of canons challenged the election on the grounds that it had been procured by coercion and threats. In 1235 he held the offices of treasurer of Saint-Frambaud of Senlis and of Saint-Fursy of Péronne. 

In 1240, Pierre and John, the dean of St.Martin of Tours, both received the same amount of votes in the election for bishop of Noyon. The decision was sent to Rome and through the appeals of Louis IX of France, Pierre was awarded the bishopric. The decision, drew letters of complaint from Pope Gregory IX to the archbishop of Reims, chapter of Namur, and the bishop of Palestrina. Gregory argued that Pierre was the child of an adulterous relationship and thus ineligible to hold the office of bishop without a special dispensation, and he should be removed from office and placed on a three-year suspension from his benefices. Despite papal animosity, Pierre kept his episcopate.

Crusade
Pierre accompanied his nephew, King Louis IX, on the Seventh Crusade to the Holy Land, and died near Cyprus in 1249 and was buried in the cathedral of Noyon.

Notes

References

Sources

1205 births
1249 deaths
Children of Philip II of France